Russia's turn to the East is a change of foreign policy strategy of the Russian Federation at the beginning of the 21st century, associated with a partial foreign economic reorientation towards the countries of Asia.

The goals of the turn are: to occupy a proper economic and political place in the Asia-Pacific region, to improve the balance of foreign trade, which is overly oriented towards Europe, and, from 2014, to weaken the effect of economic sanctions. The turn implies Russia's abandonment of unsuccessful attempts to integrate into the Euro-Atlantic system (which began after the end of the Cold War), the preference for ties with the "non-West" and includes both the development of the Russian Far East and cooperation with Asian countries.

The leading partner in the turn is China, with which cooperation takes place in many areas: energy, industrial, financial, and military. At the same time, Russia is trying to balance relations with China by strengthening cooperation with South Korea, North Korea and, if possible, with Japan (whose rapprochement with Russia is hindered by a close alliance with the United States).

See also
 Why Russia is not America

Notes

References
 

Foreign relations of Russia